Karnataka State Highway 20, commonly referred to as KA SH 20, is a normal state highway that runs west through Belgaum, Bagalkot, Raichur districts in the state of Karnataka. This state highway touches numerous cities and villages Viz.Hindalaga Jail , Sambra, Marihal, Nesargi, Yaragatti, Amingad, Nandavadgi, Mudgal, Kavital, Sirvar, Kalmala.

Route description 
Many villages, cities and towns in various districts are connected by this state highway. The route followed by this highway is Bachi, Belgaum, Yeraghatti, Lokapur, Bagalkot, Hungund, Lingasugur, Raichur

Major junctions

National Highways 
 NH 4A at Belgaum city
 NH 4 at Belgaum
 NH 218 at Gaddanakeri

State Highways 
 KA SH 31 at Nesargi
 KA SH 1 at Murgod
 KA SH 45 and KA SH 55 at Yaragatti
 KA SH 34 at Lokapur
 KA SH 53 at Kaladhagi
 KA SH 13 at Bagalkot
 KA SH 44 at Amingad
 KA SH 60 at Hungund
 KA SH 14 at Nagarhal
 KA SH 15 and KA SH 23 at Kalmala

References

State Highways in Karnataka
Roads in Belgaum district
Roads in Bagalkot district
Roads in Raichur district
Transport in Belgaum